The James Swasey House was a historic house at 30 Common Street in Waltham, Massachusetts.  Built c. 1846, the -story wood-frame house was a well-preserved example of vernacular Greek Revival architecture, of a sort that were typically built at the time as housing for local mill workers.  James Swasey, the carpenter who built the house, and his wife occupied the house into the 20th century.

The house was listed on the National Register of Historic Places in 1989.  Sometime thereafter it was demolished or moved; a modern condominium stands at the site now.

See also
National Register of Historic Places listings in Waltham, Massachusetts

References

Houses on the National Register of Historic Places in Waltham, Massachusetts
Houses completed in 1846
Houses in Waltham, Massachusetts